The E1000 is a 3G/GSM candybar style mobile phone developed by Motorola.  This product was announced in February 2004.  The E1000 was made to replace Motorola's older 3G phones such as the A835 and A845. The E1000 includes an mp3 player and stereo speakers.  It is able to record video and taking mega pixel stills. The features list includes assisted global positioning system (AGPS) for location-based services

Specifications 
 Technology: WCDMA/UMTS and GSM 900/1800/1900
 Dimensions: 114 x 52 x 23 mm
 Weight: 140 g
 Talk time: Up to 2.5 hours
 Standby time: Up to 150 hours

Features 
 Display: 240 x 320 pixel TFT, 262K colors (2.2in diagonally)
 Ringtones: 3D Stereo Speaker Polyphonic (22 channels) and MP3 + WMA support
 16 MB shared memory, and supports microSD (TransFlash) external memory cards (not hotswappable)
 Connectivity: GPRS Class 10 (4+1/3+2), USB, Bluetooth v1.1
 Messaging: SMS, EMS, MMS, E-Mail, Instant Messaging 
 Two-way video calling / video telephony
 Integrated video and audio media player
 CIF internal camera for video calls (0.3MP), 1.2MP external camera - 8x digital zoom, exposure settings and brightness
 Video and still image capture using either camera
 Supports AGPS
 Java MIDP 2.0 Compatible
 WAP 2.0 / XHTML web browser

External links 
 Motorola Product Announcement
 GSM Arena Phone Specifications

E1000
Mobile phones introduced in 2004